Zelensky is a Slavic masculine surname.

Its Russian spelling  is romanized Zelenski, Zelenskii, Zelenskiy, or Zelensky, and originates from the toponym Zelyonoe, meaning 'green'.

Its Ukrainian spelling  is romanized Zelenskyi, Zelensky, Zelenskiy, or Zelenskyy.

Notable people with the surname include:

 Volodymyr Zelenskyy (born 1978), President of Ukraine
 Olena Zelenska (born 1978), First Lady of Ukraine
 Aleksei Zelensky (born 1971), Russian luger
 Elena Zelenskaya (born 1961), Russian opera soprano
 Igor Zelensky (born 1969), Russian ballet dancer
 Isaak Zelensky (1890–1938), Russian politician
 Varvara Zelenskaya (born 1972), Russian alpine ski racer

See also 
 Zelinski (surname)
 Żeleński, a Polish princely family

References 

Russian-language surnames
Polish-language surnames
Jewish surnames